The United Nations General Assembly Resolution 2758 (also known as the Resolution on Admitting Peking) was passed in response to the United Nations General Assembly Resolution 1668 that required any change in China's representation in the UN be determined by a two-thirds vote referring to Article 18 of the UN Charter. The resolution, passed on 25 October 1971, recognized the People's Republic of China (PRC) as "the only legitimate representative of China to the United Nations" and removed "the representatives of Chiang Kai-shek" (referring to Republic of China (ROC)) from the United Nations.

Background

China was one of the original 51 member states of the United Nations, which was created in 1945. At that time, the Republic of China (ROC), led by the Kuomintang (Chinese Nationalist Party), was the government of China. The ROC army was engaged in a civil war with troops led by the Chinese Communist Party (CCP). In 1949, the CCP proclaimed the People's Republic of China (PRC) in Beijing, and the remaining mainland ROC forces were forced to retreat to Taiwan, which Japan evacuated from in 1945 and renounced all right, title and claim to in the Treaty of San Francisco in 1951. After January 1950, the PRC was in control of mainland China, the PRC was unable to capture Taiwan, Penghu, Matsu and Kinmen as well as Hainan, Dachen, and thus these remained as ROC ruled lands. 

The PRC claimed to be the successor government of the ROC, while the Kuomintang in Taiwan championed the continued existence of the Republic of China. Both claimed to be the only legitimate Chinese government, and each refused to maintain diplomatic relations with countries that have recognized the other. The ROC continued to represent China in the UN until Resolution 2758 was passed.

Article 3 of the UN Charter provides:

Additionally, the ROC had signed and ratified the Vienna Convention on Diplomatic Relations on 18 April 1961 and 19 December 1969 respectively.

Proceedings at the United Nations
On 15 July 1971, 17 UN members, led by Albania, requested that a question of the "Restoration of the lawful rights of the People's Republic of China in the United Nations" be placed on the provisional agenda of the twenty-sixth session of the United Nations General Assembly. In an explanatory memorandum accompanying their request, the 17 UN members observed that for years they had protested against what they considered were hostile and discriminatory policy followed by several governments with regard to the communist government of mainland China, which they considered to be the genuine representative of the Chinese people. The existence of the People's Republic of China, they declared, was a reality which could “not be changed to suit the myth of a so called Republic of China, fabricated out of a portion of Chinese territory”. In the view of the 17 UN members, the ROC were unlawful authorities installed in the island of Taiwan which claimed to represent China, and they remained there only because of the permanent presence of United States Armed Forces. No important international problems, they added, could be solved without the participation of the People's Republic of China. It was in the fundamental interests, they concluded, of the United Nations to "restore" promptly to the People's Republic of China its seat in the organization, thus putting an end to a "grave injustice" and "dangerous situation" which had been perpetuated in order to fulfill a policy that had been increasingly repudiated. This meant the immediate expulsion of the representatives of the Chiang Kai-shek regime from the seat which it held in the United Nations.

On 17 August 1971, the United States requested that a second item, "The representation of China in the United Nations" also be placed on the provisional agenda. In the explanatory memorandum accompanying the U.S. request, the U.S. said that in dealing with the problem of the representation of China, the United Nations should take cognizance of the existence of both the People's Republic of China and the Republic of China; it should reflect that incontestable reality in the manner in which it made provision for China's representation. The U.S. asserted that the UN should not be required to take a definitive position on the respective conflicting claims of the People's Republic of China or the Republic of China, pending a peaceful resolution of the matter as called for by the United Nations Charter. Thus, the U.S. added, the People's Republic of China should be represented and at the same time provision should be made to ensure that the Republic of China was not deprived of its representation.

On 22 September 1971, the United States proposed at the UN General Committee that the two items be combined into one item called "The Question of China". The proposal was, however, rejected by 12 votes to 9 with 3 abstentions.

On 25 September 1971, the first Albanian-backed draft resolution, A/L.630 and Add.l and 2, was submitted by 23 states including 17 of the states which had joined in placing the question on the agenda, to: "[...]restore to the People's Republic of China all its rights and expel forthwith the representatives of Chiang Kai-shek."

On 29 September 1971, a second draft resolution, A/L.632 and Add.l and 2, sponsored by 22 members including the U.S., was proposed declaring that any proposal to deprive the Republic of China of representation was an important question under Article 18 of the UN Charter, and thus would require a two-thirds supermajority for approval.

On 29 September 1971, a third draft resolution, A/L.632 and Add.l and 2, sponsored by 19 members including the U.S., was proposed by which the Assembly would affirm the right of representation of the People's Republic of China and recommend that it be seated as one of the five permanent members of the Security Council, while also affirming the continuing right of representation of the Republic of China.

On 15 October 1971 the representatives of 22 UN members requested the UN Secretary-General to distribute, as an official Assembly document, a statement of the Ministry of Foreign Affairs of the People's Republic of China dated 20 August 1971. In this statement, made in response to the U.S. letter of 17 August 1971 and its accompanying explanatory memorandum, the People's Republic of China declared that the U.S. proposal was a blatant exposure of the Nixon government's scheme of creating "two Chinas" in the United Nations. It added that there was only one China, the People's Republic of China.  Taiwan, it continued, was an inalienable part of Chinese territory and a province of China which had already been returned to the motherland after the Second World War. It went on to state that the U.S. was plotting to separate Taiwan from China and was wildly attempting to force members of the UN to submit to its will. The Chinese government declared that the Chinese people and government firmly opposed "two Chinas", "one China, one Taiwan", or any other similar arrangement, as well as the claim that "the status of Taiwan remains to be determined". They declared they would have absolutely nothing to do with the UN in such scenarios.

Discussion at the Assembly took place at 12 plenary meetings between 18 and 26 October 1971 with 73 member states taking part. During the debates four more draft resolutions were submitted - three by Tunisia and one by Saudi Arabia. Broadly, each of these draft resolutions was a variation on the third draft resolution described above, backed by the U.S. Notably, the Saudi-proposed resolution would have held that the people of the island of Taiwan had a right to self-determination. Similarly, the Tunisian resolution would have called for the Republic of China government to be represented in the United Nations under the name "Formosa".

Algeria's representative in the debates submitted that to recognize that the government of the People's Republic of China was lawfully entitled to represent China did not imply the eviction of a member but the eviction of the representatives of a dissident minority regime.  The U.S., in its submission, took the opposite view; arguing that adoption of the resolution expelling the representatives sent from Taipei would imply the termination of the membership of a longstanding member. The spokesman of the Republic of China submitted that his country had earned its place in the United Nations by virtue of its contribution to peace and freedom during the Second World War. He said the Chinese communist regime, which had never had the moral consent of the Chinese people, could in no way be regarded as the representative of the great Chinese nation. Various members including two permanent members of the security council, the United Kingdom and the USSR, argued that requiring the matter to be subject to a supermajority vote was not appropriate because the adoption of the Albanian proposed resolution did not involve the admission or expulsion of a member. Rather it concerned only credentials and Taiwan had never been a member.  They argued there was only one Chinese state that was a member.  Any other Chinese state would have to apply for membership in accordance with the Charter.

On 25 October 1971, the voting took place. In the first vote held, the Assembly rejected the U.S. backed proposal that the matter would require a supermajority vote — the 'important question motion'. The Assembly then voted on a separate U.S. proposal that the words "and to expel forthwith the representatives of Chiang Kai-shek from the place which they unlawfully occupied at the United Nations and in all the organizations related to it" be removed from the draft resolution. This motion would have allowed the PRC to join the UN as "China's representative", while allowing the ROC to remain a regular UN member (if there had been enough votes for it). The motion was rejected by a vote of 61 to 51, with 16 abstentions.

At this point the representative of the Republic of China, Ambassador Liu Chieh, stated "in view of the frenzy and irrational manner that has been exhibited in this hall, the delegation of the Republic of China has now decided not to take part in any further proceedings of this General Assembly."  He said the "ideals upon which the UN was founded" had been "betrayed".

The Assembly then adopted draft Albanian proposed resolution A/L. 630 and Add.l and 2, by a roll-call vote of 76 to 35, with 17 abstentions, as Resolution 2758. The Beijing government began representing China at the UN from 15 November 1971 and its delegates were seated at the UN Security Council meeting held on 23 November 1971, the first such meeting where representatives of the Beijing government represented China.

Votes

Later developments

On 23 July 2007, Secretary-General of the UN Ban Ki-moon rejected Taiwan's membership bid to "join the UN under the name of Taiwan", citing Resolution 2758 as acknowledging that Taiwan is part of China, although it is important to note, not the People's Republic of China. Since Resolution 2758 was said to be "deliberately ambiguous" and did not use the word 'Taiwan', Ban Ki-moon's interpretation to this effect came under fire from the American media and was also opposed by several UN members led by the U.S.  A report by the American think tank the Heritage Foundation, also suggests that the US government issued a nine-point démarche specifically rejecting the Secretary-General's statement. The US did not make any public pronouncement on the matter. Nevertheless, Secretary-General Ban Ki-moon's statement reflected long-standing UN policy and is mirrored in other documents promulgated by the United Nations. For example, the UN's "Final Clauses of Multilateral Treaties, Handbook", 2003 (a publication which predated his tenure in Office) states:

...regarding the Taiwan Province of China, the Secretary-General
follows the General Assembly’s guidance incorporated in resolution 2758 (XXVI) of the General Assembly of 25 October 1971 on the restoration of the lawful rights of the People’s Republic of China in the United Nations. The General Assembly decided to recognize the representatives of the Government of the People’s Republic of China as the only legitimate representatives of China to the United Nations. Hence, instruments received from the Taiwan Province of China will not be accepted by the Secretary-General in his capacity as depositary.

Controversy
According to some viewpoints, Resolution 2758 solved the issue of "China's representation" in the United Nations—but it left the issue of Taiwan's representation unresolved in a practical sense. The ROC government continues to hold de facto control over Taiwan and other islands. While the PRC claims sovereignty over all of "China" and claims that Taiwan is part of China, it does not exercise actual authority over Taiwan, though it continues to claim that it holds such sovereignty. Former president Ma Ying-jeou said during his term, "The Republic of China is a sovereign country, and mainland China is part of our territory according to the Constitution. Therefore, our relations with the mainland are not international relations. It is a special relationship".

On the other hand, although policy has changed, and the ROC Government now focuses on representing the interests of the island of Taiwan formally via its constitution, the ROC still claims to be the state of China, and thus its juridical claim to the right to govern the whole of China still holds. Most importantly, although Taiwan has been governed by the ROC as a de facto separate country, some argue that de jure Taiwan was not transferred to China in the post-WWII San Francisco Peace Treaty, which left its disposition open. The pursuit of independence from "China" (the ROC) is a controversial issue in Taiwanese politics.

The ROC framed the issue as one involving "the expulsion of a member". The United Kingdom and the USSR took a different view, arguing that only one Chinese state was a member and so the question was merely one of which Chinese delegation's credentials to accept and that any other Chinese state would have to apply for membership in accordance with the Charter. 

The Resolution has been criticized as illegal by the Republic of China government, since expulsion of a member requires the recommendation of the Security Council and can only occur if a nation "has persistently violated the Principles contained in the present Charter," according to Article 6.

Attempts were made to get a review of Resolution 2758 onto the agenda with a proposal in 1998 noting that "as to its return to the United Nations, the Government has made it clear that it no longer claims to represent all of China, but that it seeks representation only for its 21.8 million people". During the 2008 presidential election, referendums were held in Taiwan asking whether it should join the UN under "Taiwan" or "Republic of China"/any other suitable name. The motions failed because less than the required fraction of the electorate voted. The ROC administration under Ma Ying-jeou dropped attempts to become a UN member state.

See also
China and the United Nations
United Nations General Assembly resolution
United Nations General Assembly Resolution 505

References

External links

 Original text of Resolution 2758 (XXVI)
 Vienna Convention on Diplomatic Relations signed and ratified by Republic of China
 Restoration of the lawful rights of the People's Republic of China in the United Nations (continued)

2758
1971 in the United Nations
1971 in law
1971 in China
1971 in Taiwan
General Assembly Resolution 2858
Taiwan and the United Nations
Cross-Strait relations
Foreign relations of Taiwan